Elizabeth Fensham (born 1953) is an Australian writer.

She was born in Summer Hill, Sydney, Australia, where she grew up as the daughter of a headmaster (James Wilson Hogg) at Trinity Grammar School. She lives in Victoria's Dandenong Ranges, where she is an English teacher at a highschool, and is married to an artist and has two adult sons, the elder a Sydney-based artist Alex Fensham.

Her first novel, The Helicopter Man, won the CBCA Book of the Year for Younger Readers in 2006. According to WorldCat, the book is held in 486 libraries, and has been translated into Italian by Loredana Serratore as Corri e non voltarti mai.  Previous young adult novels include Miss McAllister’s Ghost and Goodbye Jamie Boyd. Fensham's book for younger children, Matty Forever, was shortlisted for the Children's Book of the Year Award: Younger Readers in 2009 . The companion, Bill Rules, was published in 2010 and was shortlisted for the Queensland Premier's Literary Awards in 2011. Her third and final book in the "Matty" series, Matty and Bill for Keeps was  published in 2012. She has also appeared as a guest speaker at the Melbourne Writers Festival.
Melbourne theatre company 'Monkey Baa' have toured a performance version of her book Goodbye Jamie Boyd around the eastern side of Australia.

References

1953 births
Living people
Australian women novelists
Australian writers of young adult literature
Women writers of young adult literature